Events in 2004 in animation.

Events

January
 January 5: 
 The first episode of Dragon airs.
 The first episode of Little Red Tractor airs.
 January 16: Teacher's Pet, produced by the Walt Disney Company, is released. It serves as the series finale.
 January 25: The Simpsons episode "Diatribe of a Mad Housewife" is first broadcast, guest starring the Olsen Twins and novelists Tom Clancy and Thomas Pynchon.

February
 February 1: Futari wa Pretty Cure, the first installment of the Pretty Cure franchise, first airs.
 February 7: The 31st Annie Awards are held. 
 February 11: Jean-François Laguionie's Black Mor's Island premiers.

March
 March 4: The first episode of Tripping the Rift airs.
 March 6: Mamoru Oshii's Ghost in the Shell 2: Innocence premiers.
March 20: 
 Immortal, directed by and based on Enki Bilal's comic book La Foire aux immortels premiers.
 The Danish film Terkel in Trouble airs.

April
 April 2: Home on the Range, produced by the Walt Disney Company, is released.
 April 3: The first episode of Danny Phantom airs.
 April 12: The first episode of Peep and the Big Wide World airs to positive acclaim.
 April 17: Bill Plympton's Hair High is first released.
 April 18: The Simpsons episode My Big Fat Geek Wedding is first broadcast, guest starring creator Matt Groening.
April 28: The earliest known Eddsworld animation goes online.

May
 May 10: Voice actor Greg Burson is arrested after barricading himself inside his home, holding three female roommates hostage while being drunk and carrying a gun.
 May 11: The pilot for Invader Zim makes its debut on DVD.
 May 12–31: 2004 Cannes Film Festival: Jonas Geirnaert, a young Belgian film student, sends in an unfinished animated short, Flatlife, to the festival, which promptly wins the Jury Prize for Best Short Film. This launches his media career in Flanders.
 May 15: Shrek 2 premiers during the 2004 Cannes Film Festival.
 May 17: The Simpsons episode Bart-Mangled Banner first airs, and became controversial in the United States for satirizing the U.S. Patriot Act.
 May 24: The first episode of Kikoriki airs.
 May 31: The first episode of Peppa Pig airs.

June
 June 17: Kim Jun-ok's Tentacolino, a sequel to the notorious animated film The Legend of the Titanic, is released.
 June 19:  The first episode of Winx Club airs.

July
 July 17: Katsuhiro Otomo's Steamboy airs.
 July 31: The first episode of Justice League Unlimited airs.

August
 August 1: The final episode of Rugrats airs.
 August 9: Donald Duck receives a star at the Hollywood Walk of Fame.
 August 13: The first episode of Foster's Home for Imaginary Friends airs.
 August 16: The first episode of LazyTown airs.
 August 29: The first episode of Atomic Betty airs.

September

 September 5: Hayao Miyazaki's Howl's Moving Castle is first released.
 September 6: The first episodes of The Tofus airs.
 September 7: The first episode of Miss Spider's Sunny Patch Friends is broadcast.
 September 9: SIP Animation and the newly rebranded Jetix Europe announce the work of a new co-production tentatively titled The Insiders. The show would eventually premiere as A.T.O.M. - Alpha Teens on Machines in 2005.
 September 11: The first episode of The Batman airs.
 September 13: The first episode of Higglytown Heroes airs.
 September 19: Piet De Rycker and Thilo Rothkirch's Lauras Stern (Laura's Star) premiers.
 September 22: The first episode of Bro'Town airs.
 September 25: Samurai Jack airs its final episode of its original run.

October
 October 1: The first episode of The Koala Brothers airs.
 October 11: 
 The first episode of The Backyardigans airs.
 The first episode of Maya & Miguel airs.
 The first episode of Postcards from Buster airs.
 PBS Kids GO! is launched.
 October 12: Episodes 21-26 of Invader Zim make their debut on DVD in the U.S.
 October 21: Robert Zemeckis' The Polar Express is first released.
 October 24: The first Nicktoons Film Festival is broadcast and organised.
 October 27: 
 The Walt Disney Company and Pixar release The Incredibles.
 The first episode of Drawn Together airs.

November
 November 5: The first episode of Cartoon Alley airs.
 November 7: 
 The first episode of Perfect Hair Forever airs.
 The first episode of 6teen airs.
 November 8:  The first episode of ToddWorld airs.
 November 14: 
 9th Animation Kobe is held.
 The SpongeBob Squarepants Movie is first released.
 November 19: The first episode of Hi Hi Puffy Ami Yumi airs.

December
 December 1: The first episode of Poko airs.
 December 9: Áron Gauder's The District! premiers.
 December 28: Duck and Cover and Popeye the Sailor Meets Sindbad the Sailor are added to the National Film Registry.
 December 31: After 32 years, the final episode of Loeki de Leeuw airs. It was a series of stop-motion shorts which served as bumpers before and after commercial breaks on Dutch television.

Awards
Academy Award for Best Animated Feature: The Incredibles
Animation Kobe Feature Film Award: Ghost in the Shell 2: Innocence
Annecy International Animated Film Festival Cristal du long métrage: Oseam
Annie Award for Best Animated Feature: The Incredibles
Goya Award for Best Animated Film: Pinocchio 3000
Japan Media Arts Festival Animation Award: Mind Game
Mainichi Film Awards - Animation Grand Award: The Place Promised in Our Early Days

Films released

 January 1 - Bob the Builder: Snowed Under: The Bobblesberg Winter Games (United Kingdom and United States)
 January 16 - Teacher's Pet (United States) (produced in 2003)
 January 17 - Dead Leaves (Japan)
 January 22 - The Butterfly Lovers (China)
 February 9 - Pinocchio 3000 (Canada, France, and Spain)
 February 10:
 The Lion King 1½ (United States)
 VeggieTales: An Easter Carol (United States)
 February 11 - The Island of Black Mor (France)
 February 14 - Saint Seiya: Heaven Chapter ~ Overture (Japan)
 February 20 - Clifford's Really Big Movie (United States)
 March 6:
 Ghost in the Shell 2: Innocence (Japan)
 One Piece: Curse of the Sacred Sword (Japan)
 March 7 - Doraemon: Nobita in the Wan-Nyan Spacetime Odyssey (Japan)
 March 9 - Winnie the Pooh: Springtime with Roo (United States)
 March 18 - Boo, Zino & the Snurks (Germany and Spain)
 March 24: 
 Los balunis en la aventura del fin del mundo (Spain)
 Immortel (France)
 April 1 - Derrick – Duty Calls! (Germany and Ireland)
 April 2:
 Glup (Spain) (produced in 2003)
 Home on the Range (United States)
 Terkel in Trouble (Denmark)
 April 6 - Corto Maltese: La maison dorée de Samarkand (France)
 April 7 - Charley and Mimmo (France, Luxembourg, and South Korea)
 April 17:
 Crayon Shin-chan: The Storm Called: The Kasukabe Boys of the Evening Sun (Japan)
 Detective Conan: Magician of the Silver Sky (Japan)
 Hair High (United States)
 April 18 - Appleseed (Japan)
 May 18 - VeggieTales: A Snoodle's Tale (United States)
 May 19 - Shrek 2 (United States)
 June 22 - Scooby-Doo! and the Loch Ness Monster (United States)
 June 24 - McDull, prince de la bun (Hong Kong)
 June 30 - Les Aventures extraordinaires de Michel Strogoff (France)
 July 8 - Patoruzito (Argentina)
 July 12 - Stellaluna (United States and Canada)
 July 17: 
 Pokémon: Destiny Deoxys (Japan)
 Steamboy (Japan)
 July 24:
 The Great Pig Pirate Mateo (South Korea)
 Lady Death: The Movie (United States)
 August 3 - Bratz: Starrin' & Stylin' (United States)
 August 7 - Mind Game (Japan)
 August 13 - Yu-Gi-Oh! The Movie: Pyramid of Light (Japan)
 August 17 - Mickey, Donald, Goofy: The Three Musketeers (United States)
 August 21 - Naruto the Movie: Snow Princess' Book of Ninja Arts (Japan)
 August 27 - Mobile Suit Gundam SEED: Special Edition I – The Empty Battlefield (Japan)
 August 31 - VeggieTales: Sumo of the Opera (United States)
 September 5 - The Easter Egg Adventure (United States)
 September 14 - G.I. Joe: Valor vs. Venom (United States)
 September 24 - Mobile Suit Gundam SEED: Special Edition II – The Far-Away Dawn (Japan)
 September 26 - Laura's Star (Germany and Bulgaria)
 September 28: 
 Barbie as the Princess and the Pauper (United States)
 Tonka Tough Truck Adventures: The Biggest Show on Wheels (United States)
 September 30 - Balto III: Wings of Change (United States)
 October 1 - Shark Tale (United States)
 October 5:
 Care Bears: Journey to Joke-a-lot (United States and Canada)
 ¡Mucha Lucha!: The Return of El Maléfico (United States)
 Nine Dog Christmas (United States)
 October 12:
 Dragons: Fire and Ice (Canada)
 Felix the Cat Saves Christmas (United States)
 The Nutcracker and the Mouseking (Russia, Germany, United States, and United Kingdom)
 October 19 - Bionicle 2: Legends of Metru Nui (United States)
 October 22:
 The Legend of Buddha (India)
 Mobile Suit Gundam SEED: Special Edition III – The Rumbling Sky (Japan)
 October 28 - Neznayka and the Barrabass (Russia)
 November 5:
 The Incredibles (United States)
 The Little Polar Bear: A Visitor from the South Pole (Germany)
 November 9:
 Mickey's Twice Upon a Christmas (United States)
 Popeye's Voyage: The Quest for Pappy (Canada and United States)
 November 10 - The Polar Express (United States)
 November 14 - Muhammad: The Last Prophet (United States)
 November 16:
 Kangaroo Jack: G'Day U.S.A.! (United States)
 LeapFrog: Talking Words Factory II - Code Word Caper (United States)
 November 19 - The SpongeBob SquarePants Movie (United States)
 November 20:
 Howl's Moving Castle (Japan)
 The Place Promised in Our Early Days (Japan)
 November 23 - In Search of Santa (United States)
 November 24 - LeapFrog: Math Circus (United States)
 December 1:
 Souvenir from the Capital (Russia)
 Supertramps (Spain)
 December 2 - My Little Pony: Dancing in the Clouds (United States)
 December 3 - Frank and Wendy (Estonia)
 December 4 - Blade of the Phantom Master (South Korea)
 December 9:
 The District! (Hungary)
 Teo, Intergalactic Hunter (Spain and Argentina)
 December 10 - Circleen: Little Big Mouse (Denmark)
 December 23:
 Alosha (Russia)
 Tottoko Hamtaro Ham Ham Paradise! The Movie: Hamtaro and the Demon of the Mysterious Picture Book Tower (Japan)
 Inuyasha the Movie: Fire on the Mystic Island (Japan)
 Specific date unknown:
 Genghis Khan (Italy)
 Homeland (India)
 Tentacolino (Italy)
 Tracing Jake (Japan)

Television series debuts

Television series endings

Births

January
 January 7: Sofia Wylie, American actress (voice of Riri Williams / Ironheart in Marvel Rising).
 January 28: Zaris-Angel Hator, English actress (voice of Maisie Brumble in The Sea Beast).

March
 March 1: Izabella Alvarez, American actress (voice of Ronnie Anne Santiago in The Loud House and The Casagrandes).

May
 May 1: Charli D'Amelio, American social media personality and dancer (voice of Tinker in StarDog and TurboCat, herself in The Simpsons episode "Meat Is Murder").
 May 13: Ava Acres, American actress (voice of Erik in Happy Feet Two, Sayaka in When Marnie Was There, Zan in the Kung Fu Panda: Legends of Awesomeness episode "Kung Fu Day Care").
 May 22: Peyton Elizabeth Lee, American actress (voice of Rani in The Lion Guard).

July
 July 15: Hayden Rolence, American actor (voice of Nemo in Finding Dory).
 July 17: Shamon Brown Jr., American actor (voice of Michelangelo in Teenage Mutant Ninja Turtles: Mutant Mayhem).
 July 28: Lauren Lindsey Donzis, American actress (voice of Destiny and Déjà Vu in 101 Dalmatian Street).

August
 August 4: Noah Bentley, American actor (voice of Burple in Dragons: Rescue Riders, Mo in Elliott from Earth, Buff (Bat Truck) in Batwheels).
 August 5: 
 Albert Tsai, American actor (voice of Kid in The Mr. Peabody & Sherman Show, Peng in Abominable).
 Honor Kneafsey, British actress (voice of Robyn Goodfellowe in Wolfwalkers).

September
 September 23: Anthony Gonzalez, American actor (voice of Miguel Rivera in Coco).

October
 October 3: Noah Schnapp, Canadian-American actor (voice of Charlie Brown in The Peanuts Movie, Kai in The Legend of Hallowaiian, Jay in The Angry Birds Movie).

November
 November 17: Andre Robinson, American actor (voice of Donny McStuffins in Doc McStuffins, Meerkat Baby in Khumba, Niko in Niko and the Sword of Light, Clyde McBride in seasons 3-5 of The Loud House and The Loud House Movie, young Bilal in Bilal: A New Breed of Hero, Oliver in Summer Camp Island, Cutter in Dragons: Rescue Riders, Hansel in A Tale Dark & Grimm, Brandon in the American Dad! episode "Mused and Abused").
 November 27: Jet Jurgensmeyer, American actor (voice of Gabriel, Aiden and Rudy in Special Agent Oso, Nonny in seasons 3–4 of Bubble Guppies, Kaz and Zac in Shimmer and Shine, Orby and Dudley in Puppy Dog Pals, Dirty in The Stinky & Dirty Show, Stinky in Hey Arnold!: The Jungle Movie, young Guapo in Ferdinand, Junior in Next Gen, Pip in T.O.T.S., Cornelius in The Chicken Squad episode "House Guest").

December
 December 18: Isabella Crovetti, American actress and voice actress (voice of Shine in Shimmer and Shine, Ash in Whisker Haven, Vampirina "Vee" Hauntley in Vampirina, Zsa Zsa in SuperKitties).

Deaths

January
 January 1: Yevgeniy Migunov, Russian film director, caricaturist, illustrator, and animator (Karandash and Klyaska - Merry Hunters, Familiar Pictures), dies at age 82.
 January 8: Eddy Ryssack, Belgian comics artist and animator (Belvision), dies from a heart attack at age 75.
 January 10: Sidney Miller, American actor (voice of The Dungeon Master in Dungeons & Dragons,  Hornswoggle in The Gary Coleman Show, Horrg in Monchhichis, Oompe in Little Nemo: Adventures in Slumberland), dies at age 87.

February
 February 1: James Simpkins, Canadian animator and comics artist (National Film Board of Canada), dies at age 93.
 February 3: Jason Raize, American actor and singer (voice of Denahi in Brother Bear), commits suicide at age 28.
 February 5: John Hench, American animator, designer and creative director (Walt Disney Company), dies at age 95.
 February 11: Tony Pope, American actor (voice of Goofy and The Big Bad Wolf in Who Framed Roger Rabbit), dies at age 56.
 February 12: Anthony Rizzo, Italian-American film director (Duck and Cover), dies at age 85.

March
 March 1: Barbara Frawley, Australian actress (voice of Dot in Dot and the Kangaroo and its sequels), dies at age 68.
 March 6: Peggy DeCastro, American singer (Bird and Animal voices in Song of the South),  dies at age 83.
 March 7: Paul Winfield, American actor (voice of Mr. Smith in The Wish That Changed Christmas, Jeffrey Robbins in Gargoyles, Mr. Ruhle in The Magic School Bus, Omar Mosley/Black Marvel in Spider-Man, Sam Young in Batman Beyond, Lucious Sweet in The Simpsons, Earl Cooper in the Batman: The Animated Series episode "The Mechanic", Father in the Happily Ever After: Fairy Tales for Every Child episode "Beauty and the Beast"), dies from a heart attack at age 64.
 March 8: Robin Klein, American casting director (Foodfight!), dies at age 43.
 March 12: William Moritz, American animation film historian, dies at age 62. 
 March 14: René Laloux, French animator and film director (Les Escargots, La Planète Sauvage, Les Maîtres du temps), dies at age 74 from a heart attack.
 March 28: Peter Ustinov, English actor (voice of Prince John and King Richard in Robin Hood, and the title character in Dr. Snuggles), dies at age 82.
 Specific date unknown: John Grace, English television writer (64 Zoo Lane, Pablo the Little Red Fox, Kipper, Ethelbert the Tiger, co-creator of ReBoot), dies at an unknown age.

April
 April 1: Sándor Reisenbüchler, Hungarian film director, animator and graphic artist, dies at age 69.
 April 14:
 Micheline Charest, English-born Canadian television producer (co-founder of CINAR), dies from complications from plastic surgery at age 51.
 Harry Holt, American comics artist and animator (Walt Disney Animation Studios, Hanna-Barbera), dies at age 93.
 April 15: Mitsuteru Yokoyama, Japanese manga artist (Tetsujin 28-go), dies at age 69 from burns suffered in a fire.
 April 25: Jacques Rouxel, French animator (Les Shadoks), dies at age 73.

May
 May 3: Volus Jones, American animator (Warner Bros. Cartoons, Walter Lantz, Format Films, Hanna-Barbera, Famous Studios, UPA, Ralph Bakshi), dies at age 90.
 May 15: Jack Bradbury, American animator and comics artist (Walt Disney Company, Warner Bros. Cartoons), dies at age 89.

June
 June 10: Ray Charles, American singer, songwriter and pianist (voice of G-Clef in Blue's Big Musical Movie), dies from liver failure at age 73.
 June 13: Danny Dark, American voice actor (voice of Superman in Super Friends, announcer for StarKist and Raid), dies from a pulmonary hemorrhage at age 65.
 June 17: Todor Dinov, Bulgarian animator and comics artist, dies at age 84.

July
 July 7: Vlado Kristl, Yugoslavian-Croatian film director and animator (Don Kihot), dies at age 81.
 July 9: Isabel Sanford, American actress and comedian (voice of Betsy in the Wait Till Your Father Gets Home episode "Help Wanted", Shirley McLoon in the A Pup Named Scooby-Doo episode "A Bicycle Built for Boo!", Bernice in the Pepper Ann episode "Cocoon Gables", herself in The Simpsons episode "Milhouse Doesn't Live Here Anymore"), dies at age 86.
 July 16: Andy Engman, Swedish-Finnish-American animator (Walt Disney Company), dies at age 92.
 July 21: Jerry Goldsmith, American composer and conductor (The Secret of NIMH, Mulan, Looney Tunes: Back in Action), dies at age 75.
 July 26: Oğuz Aral, Turkish comics artist, animator, and film director and producer (Koca Yusuf (Yusuf the Wrestler), Direkler Arası (Theater), Bu Şehr-i İstanbul (This City Called Istanbul), Ağustos Böceği ile Karınca (The Cricket and the Ant), dies at age 68.
 July 28: 
 Jackson Beck, American actor (voice of Perry White in The New Adventures of Superman, the fox in Baby Huey cartoons, the father in Little Lulu, Buzzy the Crow in Herman and Katnip, Brutus the Cat in Race For Your Life, Charlie Brown, continued voice of Bluto, narrator in G.I. Joe: A Real American Hero), dies at age 92.
 Sam Edwards, American actor (voice of young Bambi in Bambi, and the title character in Rod Rocket), dies at age 89.

August
 August 18: Elmer Bernstein, American composer and conductor (Heavy Metal, The Black Cauldron), dies at age 82.

September
 September 8: Frank Thomas, American animator and pianist (Walt Disney Animation Studios), dies at age 92.
 September 15: Johnny Ramone, American musician and member of the Ramones (voiced himself in The Simpsons episode "Rosebud"), dies from prostate cancer at age 55.

October
 October 5: Rodney Dangerfield, American comedian (writer, producer, and voice of the title character in Rover Dangerfield, Rat-A-Tat-Tat in The Electric Piper, Larry Burns in The Simpsons episode "Burns, Baby Burns", himself in the Dr. Katz, Professional Therapist episode "Day Planner"), dies at age 82.
 October 10: Christopher Reeve, American actor (voice of Clark Kent in a AT&T commercial, It Zwibble in the HBO Storybook Musicals episode "Earthday Birthday"), director (Everyone's Hero), and activist, dies at age 52.
 October 25: John Peel, English disc jockey, radio presenter, record producer and journalist (voice of Announcer in the Space Ghost Coast to Coast episode "Explode"), dies from a heart attack at age 65.

November
 November 9: Ed Kemmer, American actor (model for Prince Phillip in Sleeping Beauty), dies at age 83.
 November 11: 
 Dayton Allen, American comedian and actor (voice of Deputy Dawg), dies at age 85.
 Zvonimir Lončarić, Croatian animator, sculptor and painter (art director on Surogat), dies at age 77.
 November 12: Harry Hargreaves, English comics artist, illustrator and animator (Gaumont British, GoGo the Fox), dies at age 82.
 November 30: Carmen D'Avino, American painter, sculptor and film director, dies at age 86.

December
 December 8: Dimebag Darrell, American musician and member of Pantera (composed the track "Prehibernation" which was used in the SpongeBob SquarePants episode "Prehibernation Week", and "Walk" which was used in Sonic the Hedgehog 2), was murdered at age 38.
 December 15: Alma Duncan, Canadian painter, graphic artist and film director ( Kumak the Sleepy Hunter, Hearts and Soles), dies at age 86.
 December 22: Ben van Voorn, Dutch comics artist and animator (worked for Marten Toonder's animation department and on the films Asterix Versus Caesar and Asterix and the Big Fight), dies at age 67.
 December 28: Jerry Orbach, American actor (voice of Lumière in Beauty and the Beast), dies at age 69.

See also
2004 in anime

Notes

References

External links 
Animated works of the year, listed in the IMDb

 
2000s in animation